Europe Live is Eric Johnson's fourth live album, released in 2014 by Provogue Records.

The album features Johnson, bassist Chris Maresh, and drummer Wayne Salzmann II.

Track listing
All songs written by Eric Johnson, except where noted.

Personnel
Personnel are credited alphabetically.
 John Coltrane -	Composer
 Max Crace - Graphic Design, Photography
 Kelly Donnelly - Mastering, Mixing
 Erin Franklin	- Photography
 Eric Johnson - Composer, Guitar, Liner Notes, Primary Artist, Producer, Vocals
 Nick Landis	- Mastering
 Ursula Le Guin	- Photography
 Bill Maddox	- Composer
 Chris Maresh	- Guitar (Bass)
 Wayne Salzmann II -	Drums, Vocals (Background)
 Dustin Sears	- Bass Technician, Drum Technician
 Michael Stewart	- Engineer, Tour Manager
 Peter van Leerdam -	Engineer
 Bill Webb	- Equipment Technician, Guitar Technician

References

External links
 Music Review: Eric Johnson 'Europe Live' - SeattlePi.com
 Exclusive Preview of Eric Johnson's Europe Live
 EricJohnson.com

Eric Johnson albums
2014 live albums